"Burn It Up" is fourth official single by American R&B singer R. Kelly from the album TP.3 Reloaded, released in 2005, by Jive Records. It features Puerto Rican reggaeton duo Wisin & Yandel, and was produced by Luny Tunes with co-production by Kelly himself.

Song information
The official remix features a verse by rapper Fat Joe in the beginning and it is featured in R. Kelly's album Remix City Vol. 1. The beat was reused from a track titled "Mírame" by Daddy Yankee & Deevani in the compilation album Mas Flow 2, which was also produced by Luny Tunes and Nely. The official video for the song was released on October 15, 2005.

Chart positions

Weekly charts

References

2005 singles
R. Kelly songs
Wisin & Yandel songs
Music videos directed by Bille Woodruff
Songs written by R. Kelly
Spanglish songs
Song recordings produced by Luny Tunes
2005 songs
Songs written by Yandel
Jive Records singles
Songs written by Wisin
Songs written by Víctor Cabrera
Songs written by Francisco Saldaña